Perry–Casa School District No. 2 was a school district with its school, the Perry-Casa School, in Casa, Arkansas. Serving the Perry County communities of Casa and Perry, it operated elementary school and high school divisions. Its mascot was the tiger.

By 2004 new laws were passed requiring school districts with enrollments below 350 to consolidate with other school districts. The school boards of the Perry-Casa district and the Ola School District agreed to a consolidation in which Perry-Casa annexes Ola, and voters in those districts approved the plans. On July 1, 2004, it merged with those districts and others into the Two Rivers School District.

References

Further reading
Maps of the Perry-Casa district:
 Map of Arkansas School Districts pre-July 1, 2004
  (Download)

External links
 
 Perry Casa School District No. 2 Perry County, Arkansas Basic Financial Statements and Other Reports June 30, 2004 
 Perry Casa School District No. 2  Perry County, Arkansas General Purpose Financial Statements and Other Reports June 30, 2002

2004 disestablishments in Arkansas
School districts disestablished in 2004
Defunct school districts in Arkansas
Education in Perry County, Arkansas